The 1978 Austrian Grand Prix was a Formula One motor race held on 13 August 1978 at Österreichring. This was Ronnie Peterson's last win before his death at the 1978 Italian Grand Prix.

Qualifying

Qualifying classification 

*Positions in red indicate entries that failed to qualify or pre-qualify.

Race

Race start and rain 
The crowds for the Austrian GP were full of Niki Lauda fans; but however for them Lauda qualified only 12th as the Lotus cars again took the front row, with Ronnie Peterson on pole. The surprise in qualifying was Jean-Pierre Jabouille who qualified his turbocharged Renault third. The race started at 2:00 pm local, the start saw Peterson lead into the first corner, with Carlos Reutemann snatching second from Mario Andretti. Andretti tried to get the place back later in the lap, but the two collided and Andretti retired after his car spun into the barriers while Reutemann lost a couple of places to Patrick Depailler and Jody Scheckter. On the third lap, Scheckter slid off and crashed into Andretti's abandoned Lotus, damaging both cars. On the fourth lap, a heavy rainshower hit the track and Reutemann spun off and was beached but the marshals push-started his car as it was in a dangerous position, while Nelson Piquet and Héctor Rebaque crashed out. At the end of lap six, Gilles Villeneuve headed for the pits for rain tyres having executed a monumental spin, and next lap Jabouille lost control of the Renault, managed to gather it all up and also stopped for rain tyres, while Emerson Fittipaldi was into the pits and Pironi spun off and knocked the nose cone off his Tyrrell but rejoined. Peterson finished lap seven in full control of the situation and when the last car had gone through the officials decided to stop the race and the red and black flags were held out, meaning "Race to stop and restart at a later time." After the decision had been made Peterson spun off onto the grass and got stuck, so it was Depailler who arrived first at the red and black flags. As the rain poured down, the race was stopped. It was clearly stated that the Grand Prix would now be considered a two-part race, the first part having run for seven laps and the starting grid for the 47-lap second part would be in the order in which the competitors completed lap seven. Only those cars that arrived back at the pits under their own power would be allowed to start in the second part and there would be no changing to spare cars, though repairs and resetting of suspension and brakes for rain conditions would be allowed, and naturally everyone fitted rain tyres. During the red flag, Rebaque's was towed back by the marshals undamaged but could not join the restart, though Peterson and Reutemann drove their cars back, having been extricated from the grass verges. Patrese's Arrows was towed in with the nose cone damage, and should have been wheeled away along with Rebaque's Lotus but in the confusion the Arrows management sneaked the car into the pit lane and started repairing it, even though it was illegal. The restart was timed for 3:00 pm giving everyone adequate time to prepare their cars for a really wet track. At 2:40 pm. the pit road was to be opened to allow cars to set off on a warm-up lap, and it was to shut at 2:50 pm and anyone left behind would be out of the second part of the race. It was all quite clear, but there was some discussion as to whether Peterson and Reutemann had received outside assistance driving the first part of the race, even though they had driven their cars back to the pits. With Peterson on pole position and Reutemann in last position, having spun off on lap 5, it was a delicate situation, but was resolved by allowing them both to restart, though Reutemann would be considered to be two laps behind at the start of the second race. There should have been 21 cars lined up in pairs for the second part with Andretti, Scheckter, Rebaque and Piquet already out but there were 22 cars on new grid due to the Arrows team's shady tactics for Patrese.

Race restart
The race restarted at 3:15 pm after the rain relented, and once again Peterson led followed by Depailler and Lauda. As the track began to dry, Peterson started to pull away, and behind, Reutemann was on a charge and passed Lauda for third but he was black-flagged for receiving outside assistance, and Lauda crashed out soon after, leaving Gilles Villeneuve third. The drivers changed to slicks but the top 3 remained the same and stayed so till the end; Peterson winning ahead of Depailler, with Villeneuve taking his first ever podium.

Classification

Championship standings after the race 

Drivers' Championship standings

Constructors' Championship standings

Note: Only the top five positions are included for both sets of standings.

References

Austrian Grand Prix
Grand Prix
Austrian Grand Prix
Austrian Grand Prix